David Spencer Ward (1945-2005) was an England international lawn and indoor bowler.

Bowls career
He won a bronze medal in the pairs with his elder brother Chris Ward at the 1986 Commonwealth Games in Edinburgh.

He died on 9 June 2005 in a car accident.

Family
In addition to his brother Chris being an international player his sister Jayne Roylance was also an international player and national champion.

References

1945 births
2005 deaths
English male bowls players
Commonwealth Games medallists in lawn bowls
Commonwealth Games bronze medallists for England
Bowls players at the 1986 Commonwealth Games
Medallists at the 1986 Commonwealth Games